Slovenians may refer to:

 Slovenians, inhabitants of Slovenia, citizens of Slovenia
 Ethnic Slovenians, variant term for ethnic Slovenes

See also
 Slovenia (disambiguation)
 Slovene (disambiguation)